Ing. Jan Bervida (4 September 1893 in Radkov, district Tábor – 26 January 1962 in New York, USA). Residence: United States of America, 1948–1962.
Head of department of Czechoslovakian Civilian Airways (1929–38 and also 1945–47). Vice president of ICAO and FAI. Member of ICAN and the Council of Free Czechoslovakia.

Biography 
After finishing secondary school in Tábor he began studying at the Imperial-Royal Technical University (now ČVUT) in Prague. In 1914, during the 1st World War, he was sent to Eastern Front and 1915 Bervida was taken prisoner by Russians, and later as a private of the Czechoslovak Legion he took part in  a march to the United States via Vladivostok. Upon returning to his home country he graduated from the University of Technology, receiving an MA (Ing.) in Aeronautic Engineering.

Public Works Ministry 
In 1927–29 he worked at the Public Works Ministry in Prague, where he became Head of the Aviation Department in 1929. By some sources short time before the occupation of Czechoslovakia by the Army of the Nazi Germany in 1938, President Edvard Beneš promoted him to Army General in Reserve. There is not any remark in Czech military archives about it.

The Nazi Occupation 1939–1945 
During the Nazi Occupation of Czechoslovakia from 1939 to 1945, Bervida, as a former member of Czechoslovak Legion, was fired in 1939 and became a teacher. He taught at a secondary school specializing in engineering. Later he was arrested and interrogated. Because he collaborated with the Czechoslovak government-in-exile in London, he was sentenced to death. He was saved by the end of World War II in May 1945.

Post-war 
In 1945–47, Bervida became Department Head at the Ministry of Transport (Civilian Airways) and Czechoslovak Airlines (ČSA) Director.

In 1946 was Bervida elected vice president of the FAI and one year later 1947 was he elected vice president to the International Civil Aviation Organization (ICAO).

He was unjustly charged in a court case brought against him, but the case was dropped after the intervention of President Edvard Beneš.

During Communist takeover in 1948 he was in France, where applied for citizenship. In Paris he was involved with Czechoslovak exile authorities (Council of Free Czechoslovakia). Shortly thereafter he emigrated to the United States, where he worked with the ICAO in New York and in Montreal.

References 
Bervida, Jan : "Naše křídla" (Our Wings), Prague 1939.
Berwid-Buquoy, Jan: "60. let od zahájení leteckého provozu na letišti Tábor-Čápův dvůr" (60 Years since the Founding of the Airport Tabor-Čápův dvůr), Tabor 2006.
Mejstřík, Jiří: "Czechs Around the World 1918–2000. A lexicon of expatriates who have made their mark in the world", Prague 2000.
Pejskar, Jožka: "Poslední pocta" (The Last Honour), Encyclopedia, part III., Baltimore, Maryland, USA 1989.

See also List of Czechs

Czechoslovak emigrants to the United States
Czechoslovak Legion
Austro-Hungarian military personnel of World War I
Czechoslovak prisoners of war
World War I prisoners of war held by Russia
Czechoslovak military personnel of World War I
1962 deaths
1893 births
Czech Technical University in Prague alumni